Cephalosporolides are novel lactones isolated from marine Penicillium.

External links
Cephalosporolides H and I, Two Novel Lactones from a Marine-Derived Fungus, Penicillium sp.
ChemSpider - Cephalosporolide H
ChemSpider - Cephalosporolide I
Stereoselective	synthesis	of	(‐)	Cephalosporolide D, European Journal	of	Chemistry	5	(1)	(2014)	127‐132

Lactones